Pedro Sánchez Rendón (c.1590–1658) was a Spanish politician, who served during the Viceroyalty of Peru as Mayordomo of Hospital, and Protector of Natural resources and minors of Buenos Aires.

Born in Jerez de la Frontera, was the son of Ramón Palomino Sarmiento and Ana Sánchez, belonging to distinguished lineages. His wife was Catalina Tapia, daughter of Ñuño Fernández Lobo, a nobleman born in Olivenza, and Juana de Valdenebro Guillen, born in Talavera de la Reina.

References

External links 
er-saguier.org

1590s births
1658 deaths
Spanish colonial governors and administrators
People from Buenos Aires
Spanish nobility